Vassilios Psachos, also Psakhos; 1877–?) was a Greek tug of war athlete from Zarouchleika, Patras. He was the younger brother of Georgios Psachos.

Psachos was a member of Gymnastiki Etaireia Patron, that merged in 1923 with Panachaikos Gymnastikos syllogos to become Panachaiki Gymnastiki Enosi.

He competed for Greece in the 1906 Intercalated Games held in Athens, Greece, where he won the Silver medal in the tug of war competition.

References

External links
 

1877 births
Year of death missing
Olympic tug of war competitors of Greece
Olympic silver medalists for Greece
Medalists at the 1906 Intercalated Games
Tug of war competitors at the 1906 Intercalated Games
Athletes from Patras